Emoryville is an unincorporated community and coal town in Mineral County, West Virginia, United States. It is part of the Cumberland, MD-WV Metropolitan Statistical Area. According to the Geographic Names Information System, Emoryville has also been known throughout its history as Emery, Emory, Switch Back, and Switch Back Station.

The community most likely takes its name from nearby Emory Run creek.

References 

Unincorporated communities in Mineral County, West Virginia
Unincorporated communities in West Virginia
Coal towns in West Virginia